Pakhria is a village situated in East Khasi Hills District, in the Meghalaya state of India. Agriculture is the main activity of this village.

References

Villages in East Khasi Hills district